Simulium variegatum  is a species of fly in the family Simuliidae. It is found in the Palearctic.

References

Simulium
Insects described in 1818
Nematoceran flies of Europe